Margarita Xirgu Subirá (18 June 1888, Molins de Rei, Barcelona, Spain – 25 April 1969, Montevideo, Uruguay), also Margarida Xirgu, was a Spanish stage actress, who was greatly popular throughout her country and Latin America.  A friend of the poet Federico García Lorca, she was forced into exile during Francisco Franco's dictatorship of Spain, but continued her work in America. Notable plays in which she appeared include Como tú me Deseas, La casa de Bernarda Alba, and Mariana Pineda.

An opera, Ainadamar, by the composer Osvaldo Golijov and playwright David Henry Hwang, based on Xirgu's life and her association with Lorca, was premiered in 2003. A recording of the work released in 2006 on the Deutsche Grammophon label (Catalog #642902) won the 2007 Grammy awards for Best Classical Contemporary Composition and Best Opera Recording.

Biography
Born in Molins de Rei in 1888, her family moved first to Girona in 1890 and finally to Barcelona in 1896. Her first theater work was in 1906 with the Blanca character in Mar i Cel, in the Teatre Romea. In 1908 was really successful with Joventut de príncep in the Teatre Principal. After that, in 1909, she began her film career with Guzmán el Bueno.
In 1910 she married Josep Arnall.
In 1911 Àngel Guimerà wrote “La reina jove” for her, and that year she created her own theater company. In 1912 a Buenos Aires businessman contracted her for working in South America.

She played the mermaid in La sirena varada in 1934, written by Alejandro Casona. She starred in the early film version of Garcia Lorca's Bodas de sangre, filmed in February–March 1938, the only film version of a Garcia Lorca play to star an actress who was a personal friend of the author and who had appeared in his works onstage. It is Ms. Xirgu's only sound film, and it has never been shown on American television or released on video. It was first shown on Argentine television in January 1966.

Xirgu died in Maldonado in 1969, after she had become a Uruguayan citizen according to civil rights granted for exiles. In 1988 the Catalan government repatriated her remains and they are now buried in Molins de Rei.

Xirgu's biography was written by Catalan author Antonina Rodrigo.

In 2018 the New York Times published a belated obituary for her.

References

External links
About Margarita Xirgu http://www.alejandro-casona.com/xirgu.htm  (in Spanish)
Margarita Xirgu's biography on the Uruguayan newspaper La República 
  «Margarida Xirgu, el teatre» (audio). l'Arxiu de la Paraula. Ateneu Barcelonès, 2014.
Bodas de sangre (1938) on YouTube
 

Film actresses from Catalonia
Stage actresses from Catalonia
People from Molins de Rei
Exiles of the Spanish Civil War in Uruguay
Spanish emigrants to Uruguay
Spanish musical theatre actresses
Spanish stage actresses
Uruguayan stage actresses
Uruguayan people of Catalan descent
1888 births
1969 deaths
20th-century Spanish women